Cruz Azul Fútbol Club, A.C. Premier was a professional football team that plays in the Mexican Football League. They were playing in the Liga Premier (Mexico's Third Division). Cruz Azul Fútbol Club, A.C. Premier was affiliated with Cruz Azul who plays in the Liga MX. The games were held in La Noria.

Players

Current squad

References

Liga Premier de México
Mexican reserve football clubs
Football clubs in Mexico City